Telacanthura is a genus of swift in the family Apodidae. It contains the following species:
 Black spinetail (Telacanthura melanopygia)
 Mottled spinetail (Telacanthura ussheri)

References

 
Bird genera
Taxonomy articles created by Polbot